George Schneiderman (September 20, 1894 – November 19, 1964) was an American cinematographer. He was employed on more than eighty productions during his career, and is known for his work for the Fox Film Corporation.

Partial filmography

 A Tale of Two Cities (1917)
 Cleopatra (1917)
 The Great Love (1918)
 Vagabond Luck (1919) 
 Her Elephant Man (1920)
 The Hell Ship (1920)
 Over the Hill to the Poorhouse (1920)
 Love's Harvest (1920)
 Molly and I (1920)
 The Little Wanderer (1920)
 Colorado Pluck (1921)
 Jackie (1921)
 Bare Knuckles (1921)
 Queenie (1921)
 Singing River (1921)
 Pawn Ticket 210 (1922)
 The Face on the Bar-Room Floor (1923)
 Cameo Kirby (1923)
 Man's Size (1923)
 The Iron Horse (1924)
 Kentucky Pride (1925)
 Thank You (1925)
 Lazybones (1925)
 The Shamrock Handicap (1926)
 The Blue Eagle (1926)
 3 Bad Men (1926)
 Black Paradise (1926)
 Road House (1928)
 The Big Party (1930)
 Riders of the Purple Sage (1931)
 Charlie Chan Carries On (1931)
 Stepping Sisters  (1932)
 Infernal Machine (1933)
 Walls of Gold (1933)
 Orient Express (1934)
 52nd Street (1937)

References

Bibliography
 Aubrey Solomon. The Fox Film Corporation, 1915–1935: A History and Filmography. McFarland, 2011.

External links

1894 births
1964 deaths
American cinematographers